In November 2020 during the COVID-19 pandemic, the South Korean Government officially announced that Korean Air will acquire Asiana Airlines. Korea Development Bank, a state-owned bank, will provide 800 billion won to Hanjin Group to help finance the merger between the airlines. The Ministry of Land, Infrastructure and Transport of the Republic of Korea will integrate subsidiaries Air Busan, Air Seoul and Jin Air to form a combined low-cost carrier which will focus on regional airports in Korea.

After the merger is approved and completed, Asiana Airlines could become member of SkyTeam.

Background 
On November 2020, Ministry of Land, Infrastructure and Transport announces Korean Air acquires the Asiana Airlines. Merger of Asiana Airlines has been approved in Korean Air board meeting on same date, KAL finalized the post merger integration of merger and acquisition and submitted to Korea Development Bank, state-owned bank, and main creditors of Asiana Airlines.

Detailed plan of merger of Asiana Airlines includes;

 Integrate airlines
 Korean Air merger Asiana Airlines
 Integrates subsidiaries of each airline's low-cost carrier, Jin Air, subsidiary of KAL, Air Busan, and Air Seoul, subsidiaries of Asiana Airlines.
 Detailed directions for employment maintenance and succession of collective agreements 
 Effect of integrated expectation
 Planning of efficiency for supporting the business sector
 Planning of response to market concerns
 Resolving the issues of restrictions on holding companies following fair trading law

KAL submit the merger plan, since complete of approval of overseas authorities,

Approval Countries

Approval status 
In March 2021, KAL announced the merger with Asiana Airlines will be delayed as foreign authorities have not approved the deal. Due to the delay, Asiana Airlines will be operated as a subsidiary in which the airline's operations, IT, and other systems will be operated by Korean Air until 2024.

Since 9 September, Turkey has approved the antitrust deal. Taiwan, Thailand, Vietnam have approved the merger.  On June 30, it is reported that the post-merger plans between two airlines were been finalized and approved by Korea Development Bank. Korea Fair Trade Commission approved the merger on 22 February 2022, under condition of the airline must give up some of their airport slots and transportation rights of certain regions.

On December 26, 2022, the Ministry of Commerce of the People’s Republic of China announced its approval of Korean Air’s business combination with Asiana Airlines. As of 2023, three essential countries: European Union, Japan, and the United States have not given their approval. 

And for non-essential countries, in June 2021, the Philippines is the first country to approve. On September, Malaysian authority also approved on the antitrust deal, thus Malaysia officially joined Turkey on the list of countries that approved the antitrust deal between the two airlines. Vietnam is the final non-essential country to approve the merger on 16 November 2022.

References 

Mergers and acquisitions
Korean Air
Asiana Airlines